In physics, a topological quantum number (also called topological charge) is any quantity, in a physical theory, that takes on only one of a discrete set of values, due to topological considerations. Most commonly, topological quantum numbers are topological invariants associated with topological defects or soliton-type solutions of some set of differential equations modeling a physical system, as the solitons themselves owe their stability to topological considerations. The specific "topological considerations" are usually due to the appearance of the fundamental group or a higher-dimensional homotopy group in the description of the problem, quite often because the boundary, on which the boundary conditions are specified, has a non-trivial homotopy group that is preserved by the differential equations. The topological quantum number of a solution is sometimes called the winding number of the solution, or, more precisely, it is the degree of a continuous mapping.

Recent ideas about the nature of phase transitions indicates that topological quantum numbers, and their associated solutions, can be created or destroyed during a phase transition.

Particle physics
In particle physics, an example is given by the Skyrmion, for which the baryon number is a topological quantum number. The origin comes from the fact that the isospin is modelled by SU(2), which is isomorphic to the 3-sphere  and  inherits the group structure of SU(2) through its bijective association, so the isomorphism is in the category of topological groups. By taking real three-dimensional space, and closing it with a point at infinity, one also gets a 3-sphere. Solutions to Skyrme's equations in real three-dimensional space map a point in "real" (physical; Euclidean) space to a point on the 3-manifold SU(2). Topologically distinct solutions "wrap" the one sphere around the other, such that one solution, no matter how it is deformed, cannot be "unwrapped" without creating a discontinuity in the solution.  In physics, such discontinuities are associated with infinite energy, and are thus not allowed.

In the above example, the topological statement is that the 3rd homotopy group of the three sphere is

and so the baryon number can only take on integer values.

A generalization of these ideas is found in the Wess–Zumino–Witten model.

Exactly solvable models
Additional examples can be found in the domain of exactly solvable models, such as the sine-Gordon equation,  the Korteweg–de Vries equation, and the Ishimori equation.  The one-dimensional sine-Gordon equation makes for a particularly simple example, as the fundamental group at play there is 

and so is literally a winding number: a circle can be wrapped around a circle an integer number of times. Quantum sine-Gordon model is equivalent to massive Thirring model.
Fundamental excitations are fermions: topological quantum number  is  the number of fermions. After quantization of sine-Gordon model the topological charge become 'fractional'. Consistent consideration of ultraviolet renormalization shows that a fractional number of fermions repelled over the ultraviolet cutoff. So the  gets multiplied by a fractional number depending on Planck constant.

Solid state physics
In solid state physics, certain types of crystalline dislocations, such as screw dislocations, can be described by topological solitons. An example includes screw-type dislocations associated with Germanium whiskers.

See also
Inverse scattering transform
Central charge
Quantum invariant
Quantum topology
Topological defect
Topological entropy in physics
Topological order
Topological quantum field theory
Topological string theory

References

 
Exactly solvable models
Quantum field theory